The Blue and Green Diamonds are twin towers in Miami Beach, Florida, United States. They are both  and 44 floors. They are the tallest buildings in Miami Beach, and were both completed in 2000. The towers, mirror image of each other, share a full service, stand-alone Clubhouse building designed to look like the early mansions of the rich and famous that once dotted the 1920s Miami Beach shoreline.  The complex contains a multi-level parking garage with tennis courts atop. There is a large pool deck overlooking the beach and surrounded by private Cabana Units. The towers are typically 8 residential units per floor.  The Tower Suites near the top are marked by the prominent wrap-around terraces. The top full floor features seven Penthouse units, six of which are two story with private Roof Terraces and plunge pools. The Blue Diamond (north tower) and Green Diamond (south tower) were known for being the tallest oceanfront residential towers in the United States until Jade Beach and Jade Ocean were built in Sunny Isles Beach, Florida, in 2008 and 2009.

The Towers are on Collins Avenue, north of the Eden Roc Hotel.

Gallery

See also
Akoya Condominiums
List of tallest buildings in Miami Beach

References

Twin towers
Residential skyscrapers in Miami Beach, Florida
Residential buildings completed in 2000
2000 establishments in Florida